Kyosanto may refer to:

Japan Communist Party (Marxist-Leninist)
Japanese Communist Party

See also
 Kyo Sato (born 2000), Japanese footballer